Albrecht Wehselau (born 5 November 1937) is a West German rower who represented the United Team of Germany. He competed at the 1960 Summer Olympics in Rome with the men's coxless four where they were eliminated in the round one repechage.

References

External links 
 

1937 births
Living people
West German male rowers
Olympic rowers of the United Team of Germany
Rowers at the 1960 Summer Olympics
Sportspeople from Bremen
European Rowing Championships medalists